Lukyanenko, often spelled Lukianenko, is a surname of Ruthenian origin.

People 
Artem Lukyanenko (b. 1990), Russian decathlete
Larisa Lukyanenko (born 1973), Belarusian individual rhythmic gymnast
Levko Lukyanenko (1928-2018), Ukrainian politician and Soviet dissident
Sergei Lukyanenko (born 1968), Russian science fiction and fantasy author
Yevgeniy Lukyanenko (born 1985), Russian pole vaulter

See also
 

Ukrainian-language surnames